Thor (HSK 4) was an auxiliary cruiser of Nazi Germany's Kriegsmarine in World War II, intended for service as a commerce raider.

Early history
Formerly the cargo ship Santa Cruz, she was built by Deutsche Werft, Hamburg, (DWH) in 1938, and was owned and operated by the Oldenburg Portuguese Line (OPDR), Hamburg. In the winter of 1939–40 the navy requisitioned her and had her converted into an auxiliary warship by DWH. She was commissioned as the commerce raider Thor in March 1940.

First cruise
Thor began its first combat cruise on 6 June 1940, under the command of Captain Otto Kähler.

Thor stopped her first victim on 1 July, the 9290-ton Dutch cargo ship Kertosono, which was carrying a cargo of petrol, timber, asphalt, and agricultural machinery. Kähler decided to send her under a prize crew to Lorient, France, where she arrived safely 12 days later. At the time, Thor was disguised as a Yugoslavian freighter.

On 7 July Thor encountered Delambre, a 7,030 GRT British freighter. Thor fired several broadsides, the third of which hit Delambre, stopping her dead in the water, after which Thors boarding party scuttled the ship with demolition charges.

Two days later Thor intercepted the Belgian freighter Bruges, which was carrying a cargo of wheat. Bruges was scuttled, and her crew of 44 was taken aboard Thor. On the 14th, Thor stopped another freighter carrying wheat, the British Gracefield, and sank her by demolition charges.

On 16 July Thor attacked the British freighter Wendover without warning, as Wendover was seen to be armed. Wendover was hit by several shells from Thor and set on fire. A boarding party set demolition charges which caused Wendover to capsize, and she was then sunk by gunfire. 36 of the Wendover's crew of 40 survived: two crew including the radio operator were killed in the attack; two more were wounded and died of their injuries while aboard Thor.

The Dutch freighter Tela, en route to the UK, was intercepted on 17 July. Thor fired a shot across her bow; she stopped without sending distress signals. The crew of 33 abandoned ship and were taken aboard Thor, and Tela was sunk by demolition charges.

On 28 July, Thor encountered the British armed merchant cruiser HMS Alcantara, which was armed with eight six-inch (150 mm) main guns. Kähler turned away from Alcantara and tried to outrun her for three hours until he realized Alcantara was faster than Thor. At that point Kähler decided to turn and fight, hoping to inflict enough damage on Alcantara to allow Thor to escape. Thor scored three early hits on Alcantara: one between her bridge and funnel, a second aft, and a third on her waterline that caused flooding in her engine room, forcing Alcantara to reduce speed. Thor turned away from Alcantara and received two hits from her six-inch guns, killing three crew members. Instead of risking further combat, Thor made her escape under cover of a dense smokescreen.

After the battle with Alcantara, Thor repaired her battle damage, cleaned her boilers and changed her disguise. Thor rendezvoused with the supply ship Rekum on 25 August and then returned to Brazilian waters. Two weeks later, on Sept 8, the Yugoslav Federico Glavic was stopped, but allowed to proceed unmolested, as Yugoslavia was neutral at the time. On 26 September Thors float plane discovered the Norwegian whale-oil tanker Kosmos, which was carrying over 17,000 tons of whale oil. The Kosmos would have been a highly valuable prize ship, but the fact that she was short of fuel, slow, and easily recognizable made keeping her as a prize unfeasible. Kähler ordered Kosmos to be sunk by gunfire.

On 8 October Thor caught the 8,715-ton British refrigeration ship Natia. Thor scored a direct hit, which stopped Natia dead in the water, though she continued wireless transmissions. Thor hit Natia seven or eight more times with gunfire, and a torpedo that tore open her side. Another 35 rounds were fired before she sank. 84 of Natia's 85 crew were taken aboard Thor, bringing her total to 368. Most of these prisoners were transferred to the supply ship Rio Grande in mid November.

On 5 December Thor encountered another armed merchant cruiser, a 20,062-ton ship armed with eight  and two three-inch anti-aircraft guns. Thor carried three of her four  guns aft, so Kähler decided to force Carnarvon Castle into a stern chase. Thor's gunners found their target in the fourth salvo, after which Kähler changed course, turning the chase into a circular fight in order to bring Thor's entire broadside to bear. Thor was in command of the engagement; her gunners registered more than 20 hits, forcing Carnarvon Castle to turn and flee to Montevideo, Uruguay. Six of Carnarvon Castles crew had been killed, and 32 more were wounded.

On 25 March Thor intercepted , an 8,800 ton British passenger ship. After scoring several hits on the fleeing ship, Kähler allowed her to be abandoned, before firing 16  rounds into her waterline, sinking her. Kähler decided to not risk encountering it and assumed that the British ship would arrive and assist those in the water. Unfortunately, the British warship failed to find the survivors and 331 out of about 520 survivors were ultimately rescued, primarily by the Spanish ships Cabo de Hornos, Raranga, and Bachi. Thirty-three survivors eventually reached land at Sao Luis, on the coast of Brazil, after 23 days and  adrift at sea. On the same day, 25 March, Thor stopped the 5,045-ton Swedish motor vessel Trollenholm. Sweden was neutral but Trollenholm was found to have been chartered by the British to take coal from Newcastle to Port Said. In less than 90 minutes, all 31 crewmen from Trollenholm were transferred to Thor and the freighter was sunk by demolition charges.

On her return trip to Germany, Thor encountered a third armed merchant cruiser off the Cape Verde islands. Thor approached head on and in response to Voltaire's AAA signals (an order for a ship to identify itself), fired a shot across Voltaire's bow. Thors first salvo hit Voltaires generator and radio room, rendering her unable to transmit signals. Voltaire was turned into an inferno. Two of Voltaire's six-inch guns continued to fire, but they scored only one hit on Thor, disabling her radio aerial. Voltaires obsolete guns overheated and had to cease firing, at which point the Voltaire raised a white flag. Voltaires captain and 196 men were rescued out of a crew of 296.

The last ship intercepted by Thor on her first cruise was on 16 April, on her way back to Germany; the Swedish ore carrier Sir Ernest Cassel. Two warning shots were fired, which stopped the ship; her crew was taken aboard Thor and she was sunk by demolition charges.

Second cruise
Thor first attempted to start her second cruise in the evening 19 November 1941.  However at 21:30 on the next day it collided , in dense fog, with the Swedish ore-carrier Bothnia. The 1,343-ton Swedish ship sank, while Thor returned to Kiel for repairs to its damaged bow.

Thor finally set out on her second cruise on 30 November 1941 under the command of Captain Günther Gumprich. Thor sank or captured 10 ships on her second cruise, a total of 58,644 tons, during 328 days of operation.

Thor found her first victim on 23 March, the 3,490-ton Greek freighter Pagasitikos. Her crew of 33 was taken aboard Thor, and she was sunk by a torpedo. The next day, 24 March, Thor replenished her stocks from the supply ship Regensburg.

On 30 March Thor chased the 4,470-ton British freighter Wellpark for seven hours. Gumprich sent his seaplane to strafe the freighter, but this was abandoned when Thor opened fire on Wellpark. Within 15 minutes, the Wellpark's crew abandoned ship, and she was sunk.

On 1 April Thor intercepted another British freighter, the 4,565-ton Willesden. Gumprich again ordered his floatplane to destroy the vessel's radio aerial before opening fire from Thor. After the plane's strafing run, Thor opened fire with her  guns, and set oil drums on the Willesden's deck on fire, forcing most of the crew to abandon the ship. The only remaining crew were the gunners, but they managed to fire only six shots before they were also forced to abandon ship. Thor fired 128 shells into Willesden and finished her off with a torpedo.

Two days later on the 3rd, the Norwegian freighter Aust fell victim to the same tactics. She was unable to send a distress or raider signal before she was disabled and sunk by demolition charges.

On 10 April Thor detected the 4,840-ton British freighter Kirkpool on her radar, the first installed on an armed merchant cruiser. Poor visibility and fog forced Gumprich to abandon his usual tactics and instead shadow Kirkpool until nightfall. At close range, Thor attacked first with a torpedo and a salvo of her  guns, both of which missed. The second salvo scored three hits and set Kirkpool's bridge and wheelhouse alight. With the helm unattended, Kirkpool veered towards Thor in what appeared to be an attempt to ram her attacker, which was avoided. Kirkpool's crew began abandoning ship, and after a three-hour search, 32 men were rescued from the water, including Kirkpools captain, chief engineer and first officer. The ship was sunk with a torpedo.

All of Thors victims thus far were near the Cape of Good Hope, in the shipping lanes. The Kriegsmarine High Command (SKL) ordered Thor to move into the Indian Ocean, but warned her to be aware of Japanese submarines operating in the area.

On 10 May Thor's seaplane sighted the 7,130-ton Australian liner Nankin, en route to Bombay. From a range of 13,000 yards Thor opened fire with her  guns, scoring several hits. Nankins captain gave the order to abandon ship and lowered his flags. The crew attempted to scuttle her, but the German boarding party managed to repair the damage done to the ship's engines. Nankin was renamed Leuthen and taken as a prize ship to rendezvous with Regensburg. Following resupply and prisoner transfer, Leuthen and Regensburg both sailed to Japanese-held ports. She was carrying secret papers from the New Zealand "Combined Intelligence Centre" in Wellington to the C-in-C, Eastern Fleet in Colombo.

On 14 June Thor's radar picked up a contact at 10,000 yards, and by using a converging course, was able to approach to within 1,800 yards, Thor attacked what turned out to be the 6,310-ton Dutch Shell tanker Olivia. The first salvo set Olivia ablaze, killing most of the crew. The third officer, three other Dutchmen and eight Chinese were able to lower one boat, but Thor was able to find only one man in the water. These 12 men were adrift for a month before their boat capsized in the breakers off Madagascar; one Dutch and seven Chinese mariners had died during the month at sea.

Five days later on the 19th, Thor intercepted the Norwegian oil tanker Herborg. Her seaplane disabled Herborgs radio aerial, and a warning salvo from Thor brought Herborg to a stop. The entire crew was taken aboard Thor, and a prize crew took the renamed Hohenfriedburg to Japan.

On 4 July Thor stopped another Norwegian oil tanker, the 5,895-ton Madrono, in the same manner as Herborg. A prize crew took her to Japan as well, renamed as Rossbach. Rossbach was eventually torpedoed by the American submarine , in the Kii Channel, Japan, in May 1944.

Thor's tenth and final victim was on 20 July, the British refrigerated freighter Indus. She put up a fight, turning away at full speed and firing her stern gun, but she fired only two shots before a shell from Thor hit the gun directly, killing the chief gunner and destroying the gun. The freighter's radio operator kept up a steady stream of distress signals, until another shell from Thor hit the bridge, killing him and knocking out the radio, and setting the bridge on fire. Indus was now a raging inferno, and most of her crew went overboard. Thor ceased firing and rescued 49 survivors before finishing Indus off.

Thor transferred her prisoners to the blockade runner Tannenfels, and made for Yokohama, Japan, via Batavia in the Japanese-occupied Dutch East Indies.

Yokohama
Thor reached Yokohama on 9 October 1942, where she began refitting for a third voyage. On 30 November explosions on the supply ship  destroyed her superstructure, sending a large amount of burning debris onto Thor, which was moored alongside. Both ships were rapidly set ablaze, along with Nankin/Leuthen and the Japanese freighter Unkai Maru. All four ships were destroyed in the fire and 12 of Thor's crew were killed. Thor was wrecked beyond repair and was abandoned.

References

External links
 German newsreel Hilfskreuzer Thor 

1938 ships
Auxiliary cruisers of the Kriegsmarine
Germany–Japan relations
Maritime incidents in November 1942
Ships built in Hamburg
Ship fires
World War II commerce raiders
World War II cruisers of Germany
World War II shipwrecks in the Pacific Ocean